Milwaukie Academy of the Arts, known as MAA, is a public charter school in Milwaukie, Oregon, United States. It is on the campus of Milwaukie High School, so students have access to classes taught in the main school.

Academics
In 2008, 94% of the school's seniors received their high school diploma. Of 35 students, 33 graduated, 1 dropped out, and one returned for another year of school.

References

High schools in Clackamas County, Oregon
Charter schools in Oregon
Educational institutions established in 2005
Private high schools in Oregon
2005 establishments in Oregon